The American composer Harry Partch (1901–1974) composed in tunings not available on conventional Western instruments.  His music emphasized monophony and corporeality, in contrast to the abstract, polyphonic music prevalent at the time.  His earliest compositions were small-scale pieces to be intoned to instrumental backing; his later works were large-scale, integrated theater productions in which he expected each of the performers to sing, dance, speak, and play instruments.

Partch described the theory and practice of his music in his book Genesis of a Music, which he had published  first in 1947, and in an expanded edition in 1974.  A collection of essays, journals, and librettos by Partch was published posthumously as Bitter Music: Collected Journals, Essays, Introductions, and Librettos 1991.   Philip Blackburn edited a collection of Partch's writings, drawings, scores, and photographs, published as Enclosure 3 in 1997.

Partch partially supported himself with the sales of recordings, which he began making in the late 1930s.  He published his recordings under the Gate 5 Records label beginning in 1953.  Towards the end of his life, Columbia Masterworks released records of his works. Partch scored six films by Madeline Tourtelot, starting with 1957's Windsong, and was the subject of a number of documentaries.

Music and music theatre

Seventeen Lyrics by Li Po (1930–1933)
Two Psalms (1931)
The Potion Scene (from Shakespeare's Romeo and Juliet) (1931/1955)
The Wayward
Barstow: Eight Hitchhikers' Inscriptions (1941/1954/1967)
San Francisco: A Setting of the Cries of Two Newsboys on a Street Corner (1943)
The Letter (1943)
U.S. Highball (1943/1955)
Yankee Doodle Fantasy (1944)
Dark Brother (1942–1943)
Two Settings from Joyce's Finnegans Wake (1944)
"I'm very happy to be telling you about this..." (1945)
Two Studies on Ancient Greek Scales (1946)
Eleven Intrusions (1949–1950)
Plectra and Percussion Dances
Ring Around the Moon (1949–1950)
Castor and Pollux (1952)
Even Wild Horses (1952)
Oedipus (1950/1952–1954/1967)
Two Settings from Lewis Carroll (1954)
Ulysses at the Edge (1955)
The Bewitched (1955/1973)
Windsong (1955)
rewritten as Daphne of the Dunes (1967)
Revelations in the Courthouse Park (1960)
Rotate the Body in All Its Planes (1961)
Bless This Home (1961)
Water! Water!: An Intermission with Prologues and Epilogues (1961)
And on the Seventh Day Petals Fell in Petaluma (1963–66)
Delusion of the Fury—A Ritual of Dream and Delusion (1965–66)
The Dreamer That Remains—A Study in Loving (1972)

Books

Genesis of a Music (1947; revised 1974) Da Capo Press. 
Bitter Music: Collected Journals, Essays, Introductions, and Librettos (1991; published posthumously) University of Illinois Press. 
Enclosure 3 (1997) Innova.

Recordings

Audio

Partch made recordings of his own music; on recordings such as the soundtrack to Windsong, he used multitrack recording, which allowed him to play all the instruments himself.  He never used synthesized or computer-generated sounds, though he had access to such technology.

The World of Harry Partch (Columbia Masterworks MS 7207 & MQ 7207, 1969, out of print) Daphne of the Dunes, Barstow, and Castor & Pollux, conducted by Danlee Mitchell under the supervision of the composer.
Delusion of the Fury (Columbia Masterworks LP M2 30576, 1971; CD Innova Recordings 406, 2001) Delusion of the Fury, conducted by Danlee Mitchell under the supervision of the composer and "EXTRA: A Glimpse into the World of Harry Partch", composer introduces and comments on the 27 unique instruments built by him.
Enclosure II (early speech-music works) (Innova 401)
Enclosure V ("On a Greek Theme") (Innova 405)
Enclosure VI ("Delusion of the Fury") (Innova 406)
Harry Partch: Delusion of the Fury. A Ritual of Dream and Delusion (Wergo, 2022) Delusion of the Fury, conducted by Heiner Goebbels.

Film

See also

Experimental musical instrument
List of instruments by Harry Partch

References

Notes

{{}}

Works cited

External links
Harry Partch Information Center
Corporeal Meadows: Harry Partch an American Original
Art of the States: Harry Partch – Three works by the composer
Enclosures Series: Harry Partch's archives published as book, film and audio from innova
Downloadable audio from the out-of-print LP "The World of Harry Partch" 
2004 Selections, National Recording Preservation Board of The Library of Congress
Listen to an excerpt from Partch's "Delusion of the Fury" at Acousmata music blog

Harry Partch
Partch, Harry